Stock Exchange building can mean:

 the Gothenburg City Hall
 the Stock Exchange Tower in London
 the Stockholm Stock Exchange Building